In algebra, the Leibniz formula, named in honor of Gottfried Leibniz, expresses the determinant of a square matrix in terms of permutations of the matrix elements.

Another common notation used for the formula is in terms of the Levi-Civita symbol and makes use of the Einstein summation notation, where it becomes
 
which may be more familiar to physicists.

Directly evaluating the Leibniz formula from the definition requires   operations in general—that is, a number of operations asymptotically proportional to  factorial—because  is the number of order- permutations. This is impractically difficult for even relatively small . (In practical applications of numerical linear algebra, however, explicit computation of the determinant is rarely required.) See, for example, . The determinant can also be evaluated in fewer than  operations by reducing the problem to matrix multiplication, but most such algorithms are not practical.

Formal statement and proof 

Theorem.
There exists exactly one function  which is alternating multilinear w.r.t. columns and such that .

Proof.

Uniqueness: Let  be such a function, and let  be an  matrix. , so that 

Also, let  denote the -th column vector of the identity matrix.

.

As  is multilinear, one has

From alternation it follows that any term with repeated indices is zero. The sum can therefore be restricted to tuples with non-repeating indices, i.e. permutations:

Because F is alternating, the columns  can be swapped until it becomes the identity.  The sign function  is defined to count the number of swaps necessary and account for the resulting sign change.  One finally gets:

Existence: We now show that F, where F is the function defined by the Leibniz formula, has these three properties.

Multilinear:

Alternating:

Thus if  then .

Finally, :

Hence the determinant can be defined as the only function  with these three properties.

See also

 Matrix
 Laplace expansion
 Cramer's rule

References
 
 

Determinants
Gottfried Wilhelm Leibniz
Linear algebra
Articles containing proofs